Rhadinaea vermiculaticeps is a species of snake in the family Colubridae. It is found in Panama.

References 

Reptiles described in 1860
Colubrids
Reptiles of Panama
Snakes of South America